The Women's 400m athletics events for the 2012 Summer Paralympics took place at the London Olympic Stadium from August 31 to September 8. A total of 6 events were contested over this distance for 6 different classifications.

Results

T12

 
 
 
The event consisted of 4 heats, 2 semifinals and a final. Results of final:

T13

 
 
 
The event consisted of a single race. Results:

T37

 
 
 
The event consisted of 2 heats and a final. Results of final:

T46

 
 
 
The event consisted of a single race. Results:

T53

 
 
 
The event consisted of a single race. Results:

T54

 
 
 
The event consisted of 2 heats and a final. Results of final:

References

Athletics at the 2012 Summer Paralympics
2012 in women's athletics
Women's sport in London